Sir Francis Weston KB (1511 – 17 May 1536) was a gentleman of the Privy Chamber at the court of King Henry VIII of England. He became a friend of the king but was later accused of high treason and adultery with Anne Boleyn, the king's second wife. Weston was condemned to death, together with George Boleyn, Viscount Rochford, Henry Norris, William Brereton and Mark Smeaton. They were all executed on 17 May 1536, two days before Anne Boleyn suffered a similar fate.

Origins
He was the only son of Sir Richard Weston (1465–1541), KB, of Ufton Court in Berkshire and Sutton Place in Surrey, a prominent courtier and diplomat who served under King Henry VIII as Governor of Guernsey, Treasurer of Calais and Under-Treasurer of the Exchequer. His mother was Anne Sandys, a daughter of Oliver Sandys of Shere in the parish of Dorking in Surrey. His uncle was Sir William Weston  (died 1540), the last Prior of the Order of St John in England, deemed Premier Baron of England. His ancestors had long held high office in the Knights Hospitallers.

Career
In 1526, aged only fifteen, he is listed as a page at court. Although he was twenty years younger than the King, he quickly became a minor member of the King's circle, listed as beating Henry at bowls, tennis, dice and other games. In 1532 he was made a Gentleman of the Privy Chamber, giving him close access to the King. Other honours followed, including becoming a Knight of the Bath at the coronation of Anne Boleyn in 1533.

Marriage and children
In 1530 he married Anne Pickering, a daughter to Sir Christopher Pickering of Killington in Cumberland. An oak marriage chest with carved heads of Francis and Anne is preserved in Saffron Walden Museum in Essex. Following Francis's execution in 1536, Anne remarried to Sir Henry Knyvet (1510–1547) of Charlton in Wiltshire, Master of the Jewel Office. By Anne he had a son:
Henry Weston (born 1535), who at the age of six became heir to his grandfather Sir Richard Weston.

Arrest
Once arrested, Anne Boleyn was attended by four unsympathetic ladies, who had been instructed by the King's chief minister Thomas Cromwell to report on the Queen's actions. Anne told one of these ladies, Mrs. Coffin, that she had reprimanded Weston for flirting with Madge Shelton, who was betrothed to his fellow courtier Henry Norris. When Anne had wondered aloud to Weston why Norris had not yet married Madge, Weston replied, "[Norris] came more to her [Anne's] chamber for her than for Madge."

Execution
Francis was executed at the age of twenty-five after being accused of committing adultery with Queen Anne Boleyn, treason and plotting to kill the king. His father is said to have offered all the family had in order to gain a pardon for his son. The evidence supporting the accusations is dubious. Although a myth has arisen in the last twenty years that the men were accused of "buggery" as well as treason, this is unlikely to be true. This myth has arisen solely due to the unsubstantiated theories of Retha Warnicke in her 1989 biography of Anne Boleyn. None of the men were charged with "buggery" with the Queen or with each other, and there were no extant claims of homosexual nor heterosexual misconduct relating to any of them. Francis was beheaded on Tower Hill on 17 May 1536 along with his co-accused, George Boleyn, Viscount Rochford; William Brereton; Henry Norris and Mark Smeaton.

Notes

References

Bibliography

External links
 Sir Francis Weston Family tree
 Weston, Sir Richard (c.1465–1541), of Sutton Place, Surr.

1510s births
1536 deaths
Executions at the Tower of London
People executed under Henry VIII
Executed people from Surrey
People from Woking
Prisoners in the Tower of London
Guernsey politicians
English knights
People from Ufton Nervet
Gentlemen of the Privy Chamber
People executed by Tudor England by decapitation
Publicly executed people